Cetoconcha is the only extant genus of saltwater clams in the family Cetoconchidae.

Species 
 Cetoconcha alephtinae (Krylova, 1991)  
 Cetoconcha angolensis Allen & Morgan, 1981  
 Cetoconcha atypha Verrill and Bush, 1898
 Cetoconcha boucheti Poutiers & Bernard, 1995  
 Cetoconcha braziliensis Allen & Morgan, 1981  
 Cetoconcha bulla (Dall, 1881)
 Cetoconcha ceylonensis Knudsen, 1970  
 Cetoconcha elegans (Krylova, 1991)  
 Cetoconcha exigua Poutiers & Bernard, 1995  
 Cetoconcha forbesi (H. Adams, 1875)  
 Cetoconcha galatheae Knudsen, 1970  
 Cetoconcha gilchristi (G.B. Sowerby III, 1904)  
 Cetoconcha gloriosa (Prashad, 1932)  
 Cetoconcha hyalina (Hinds, 1843)  
 Cetoconcha indica Ray, 1952  
 Cetoconcha malespinae Ridewood, 1903
 Cetoconcha margarita (Dall, 1886)
 Cetoconcha panamensis (Dall, 1908)  
 Cetoconcha pelseneeri Pelseneer, 1911  
 Cetoconcha sarsii (E.A. Smith, 1885)  
 Cetoconcha smithii Dall, 1908
 Cetoconcha spinosula (Thiele, 1912) comb. nov.
 Cetoconcha striata (G.B. Sowerby III, 1904)  
 Cetoconcha tenuissima Okutani, 1966  
 Cetoconcha transversa (Locard, 1898)

References

External links 
 

Poromyidae
Bivalve genera